AIP Conference Proceedings is a serial published by the American Institute of Physics since 1970. It publishes the proceedings from various conferences of physics societies. Alison Waldron is the current Acquisitions Editor for AIP Conference Proceedings. In addition to the series' own ISSN, each volumes receives its own ISBN.

AIP Conference Proceedings publishes more than 100 volumes per year, with back-file coverage to 1970 which encompasses 1,330 proceedings volumes and 100,000 published papers.

Scope
In 2010 broad subject coverage included accelerators, biophysics, plasma physics, geophysics, polymer science, optics, lasers, nanotechnology, materials science, astronomy, astrophysics, mathematical physics, nuclear and particle physics, statistical physics, atomic and molecular physics.

Abstracting and indexing
This series is indexed in the following databases, amongst others
 
Academic Search Premier
Scitation
Scopus
Web of Knowledge

References

External links

American Institute of Physics home page

Publications established in 1970
1970 establishments in the United States
Conference proceedings published in serials
Irregular journals
American Institute of Physics academic journals